The Rub-el-Hizb, also known as the Islamic Star, is an Islamic symbol. It is in the shape of an octagram, represented as two overlapping squares. It has been found on a number of emblems and flags. The main purpose of this dividing system is to facilitate the recitation of the Quran.

Etymology 
In Arabic, rubʻ means "one-fourth" or "quarter," while ḥizb (plural aḥzāb) translates to "a group." Initially, it was used in the Quran, which is divided into 60 aḥzāb (groups of roughly equal length); Rubʿ el Hizb further divides each ḥizb in four. A ḥizb is one half of a juz'.

History 
Investigations have shown that the Rub el Hizb symbol was originated from ancient petroglyphs in the Arabian desert. The symbol in question, consisting of two concentric circles with a defined punctual center, connected by eight radial sectors, is similar to the Islamic symbol when the two lines of the East-West orientation are combined, thus resulting in a hexagon with a circular symmetry.

Contemporary use

Former flags 
The first country to use the Rubʾ el-Hizb was the Marinid Sultanate in 1258.

Current flags

Emblems

Variants

See also 
 Sujud

References 

Star symbols
Islamic terminology
Islamic symbols